Jyoti Hegde is a Rudra Veena and Sitar artist from Khandarbani Gharana. She has pursued music since age 12 and completed her Masters in Music from Karnatak University of Dharwad. Vidhushi Jyoti Hegde is the first woman player of Rudra Veena in the world. She is a Grade-A artist of Rudra Veena and Sitar with the All India Radio and regularly sought after for concerts.

Career/History
Jyoti Hegde was born and brought up in Sirsi – the largest town in North Kanara district of Karnataka. She started learning music when she was 12.  At the age of 16 years, she began to learn Rudra Veena under the guidance of her first teacher Pandit Late Bindu Madhav Pathak.

Personal life
She is married to G.S. Hegde and has a son.

Discography
 Rare Instruments - Rudra Veena (ASA Music, 2012)

Awards and recognition
Jyoti Hegde has won awards such as the Naada Nidhi award, Kala Chetana and Dhrupadmani.

References

External links
 Official Website

Rudra veena players
Hindustani instrumentalists
String musicians
Sitar players
Living people
Karnatak University alumni
People from Uttara Kannada
Veena players
Indian women classical musicians
Musicians from Karnataka
Women musicians from Karnataka
21st-century Indian women musicians
21st-century Indian musicians
1963 births